Sonia Prina (born 30 November 1975) is an Italian operatic contralto who has had an active career in concerts and operas since the mid-1990s. She is particularly known for her appearances in Baroque operas and for her performances of the Baroque concert repertoire. She has recorded works by composers George Frideric Handel and Antonio Vivaldi.

Career 
Born in Magenta, Prina studied singing and the trumpet at the Music Conservatoire "Giuseppe Verdi", Milan and then pursued further studies at the La Scala Academy. She began performing in operas in the mid-1990s, first in the Italian repertoire of Rossini and Donizetti. By 1997 she had established herself as an artist in the Baroque repertoire. Some of the roles she has performed are Amastre in Serse, Bradamante in Alcina, Carilda in Arianna in Creta, Cornelia in Giulio Cesare, Ottone in L’Incoronazione di Poppea, Penelope in Il ritorno d'Ulisse in patria, Polinesso in Ariodante, Valentiniano in Ezio, and the title roles in Orlando, Ottone in villa, Partenope, Rinaldo, Tamerlano, and Tolomeo.

In 2000 she appeared in Cremona as Smeton in Donizetti's Anna Bolena. In 2006 she performed Cornelia in the Théâtre des Champs-Élysées in Paris with Andreas Scholl in the title role. In 2010 she appeared in the title role of Vivaldi's Orlando furioso in the Frankfurt Opera, conducted by Andrea Marcon, the mad Roland staged as an Italo-Rocker by David Bösch. She sang the part of Amastre at the Houston Grand Opera.
 
Prina's extensive list of performance credits also include appearances at the Barbican Centre, the Bavarian State Opera, the Glyndebourne Festival Opera, La Fenice, the Liceu, Opera Australia, the Paris Opera, the Salzburg Festival, the San Francisco Opera, the Teatro Comunale Alighieri, the Teatro di San Carlo, the Teatro Real, and the Vienna State Opera among others.

Sources
 Sonia Prina at www.bach-cantatas.com
 Sonia Prina at operabase.com

References

External links 
 
 Sonia Prina on Naxos

1975 births
Living people
People from Magenta, Lombardy
Italian contraltos
Milan Conservatory alumni
Operatic contraltos
21st-century Italian women opera  singers
20th-century Italian women  opera singers